Malatya Province is a province of Turkey. It is part of a larger mountainous area. The capital of the province is Malatya. The area of Malatya province is 12,313 km². Malatya Province had a population of 853,658 according to the results of 2000 census, whereas in 2010 it had a population of 740,643. The provincial center, the city of Malatya, has a population of 426,381 (2010). 

According to the Encyclopedia of Islam, the province is considered part of Turkish Kurdistan.

Demographics 
According to German geographers Georg Hassel and Adam Christian Gaspari, Malatya was composed of 1200 to 1500 houses in early 19th century, inhabited by Ottomans, Turkmens, Armenians, and Greeks, while the mountainous areas in the sanjak of Malatya were mostly inhabited by Kurdish tribes such as Reşwan.

The modern province of Malatya doesn't fully coincide with the province of Malatya until 1954, before when the province also included the modern Turkish province of Adıyaman, which was more than double Kurdish-speaking than Malatya according to the 1965 census.

It was estimated in 2012 that about 20% to 30% of the province was Alevi the vast majority of which was Kurdish. This group is mostly politically aligned with nationalist Kurdish parties especially after the Sivas Massacre and activity of the Kurdistan Workers' Party since the early 1990s.

History 
German academic Barbara Henning describes the province as the regional center of Kurdish nationalism in the early 20th century. During this period, the local governor of the province and mayor of Malatya city were both sympathetic to the Kurdish cause and Celadet Bedir Khan, Kamuran Alî Bedirxan and other members of the Society for the Rise of Kurdistan visited the region various times and established cordial relations with the local tribes including with the Reşwan tribe.

Geography

Districts

Malatya province is divided into 14 districts (capital district in bold):
Akçadağ
Arapgir
Arguvan
Battalgazi
Darende
Doğanşehir
Doğanyol
Hekimhan
Kale
Kuluncak
Malatya
Pütürge
Yazıhan
Yeşilyurt

Local sites
İnönü University (since 1975)
Turgut Özal Medical Center (in İnönü University)
Malatya Erhaç Airport (serving both public and military)
Eskimalatya (old city centre, historical place)

Bibliography

References

External links

  Malatya governor's official website
  Malatya
  Malatya municipality's official website
  Malatya weather forecast information
  Malatya directory
  Malatya Rent A Car

 

Turkish Kurdistan